Standings and Results for Group F of the Top 16 phase of the 2011–12 Turkish Airlines Euroleague basketball tournament.

Standings

Fixtures and results
All times given below are in Central European Time.

Game 1

Game 2

Game 3

Game 4

Game 5

Game 6

References

External links
Standings

Group F